The Life and Times of David Lloyd George is a BBC Wales drama serial first broadcast in 1981 on BBC Two. It stars Philip Madoc as David Lloyd George, the final Liberal prime minister of the UK. The cast also includes Lisabeth Miles, Kika Markham and David Markham. It was written by Elaine Morgan and produced and directed by John Hefin.

The serial is in nine hour-long parts, covering most of the major events of Lloyd George's life, from his birth in Manchester in January 1863 until his death in 1945 in Llanystumdwy. It covers his personal life, specifically the running of two families. The duration of Lloyd George's political career, of over 54 years, combined with the length of the series, means that certain periods of history have been skirted over. This is particularly the case with the various Liberal Party splits from 1918 onwards. The historical consultant for the series was the historian A. J. P. Taylor.

The serial featured music by Ennio Morricone, including the theme music ("Chi Mai"), which was a surprise hit on the UK Singles Chart, reaching number 2. The opening titles showed an elderly Lloyd George walking through the Welsh countryside near Criccieth remembering his Uncle Lloyd baptising the young David George (later Lloyd George) in a mountain stream.

Cast
 Philip Madoc - David Lloyd George
 Dylan Jones - David Lloyd George (as a boy)
 Euros Jones - William George (as a boy)
 Lisabeth Miles - Margaret Lloyd George
 William Thomas - William George
 Kika Markham - Frances Stevenson
 William Hootkins - Winston Churchill
 Meredith Edwards - Richard Lloyd
 David Markham - Herbert Henry Asquith
 Sue Jones-Davies - Megan Lloyd George
 Gillian Elisa - Anita George
 Ietsyn Garlick - Richard Lloyd George
 Elen Roger Jones - Sara
 Lisa Grug - Megan Lloyd George (older age)
 Denys Hawthorne - John Dillon
 Hugh Morton - Reginald McKenna
 Jonathan Elsom - Maurice Hankey
 Ioan Meredith - J.T. Davies
 Beryl Williams - Betsy George
 Rachel Thomas - Mrs. Richard Owen
 Jack Wynne-Williams - Richard Lloyd George
 John Gill - Lord Curzon
 Anthony Sharp - Lord Grey
 Ed Devereaux - Max Aitken
 Fulton Mackay - Andrew Bonar Law
 Michael Anthony - Georges Clemenceau
 Michael Cochrane - Charles Masterman
 Dermot Tuohy - John Redmond
 John Boxer - Murray of Elibank
 John H. Francis - Gwilym Lloyd George
 David Troughton - A. J. Sylvester
 Ruth Madoc - Lizzie Davies
 Glyn Williams - Returning officer
 Donna Edwards - Mair Lloyd George
 Kevin Flood - Edward Carson
 Ray Smith - Aneurin Bevan
 Paul Curran - Stanley Baldwin
 Lockwood West - Edward VII
 Roland Culver - William Ewart Gladstone
 Wendy Williams - Emmeline Pankhurst
 David Lyn - Sam Evans
 Richard Beale - Lord Kitchener
 Terence Brook - George V
 Shane Connaughton - Éamon de Valera
 Gabriel Connaughton - Michael Collins

Episodes
The series was first broadcast on BBC Two in 1981 and was repeated on BBC One in 1983. Episodes 1 to 8 are approximately 60 minutes long, and episode 9 is approximately 70 minutes long.

References

External links 
 

1980s British drama television series
1980s Welsh television series
1981 British television series debuts
1981 British television series endings
BBC Cymru Wales television shows
British biographical films
Cultural depictions of David Lloyd George
Cultural depictions of Éamon de Valera
Cultural depictions of Edward VII
Cultural depictions of Emmeline Pankhurst
Cultural depictions of George V
Cultural depictions of Georges Clemenceau
Cultural depictions of Herbert Kitchener, 1st Earl Kitchener
Cultural depictions of Michael Collins (Irish leader)
Cultural depictions of Stanley Baldwin
Cultural depictions of Winston Churchill
Welsh television shows